Below is a list of office-holders:

Russian Empire

Russian Federation
The First Deputy Chairman is highlighted in bold.

Sources 
Europa World Year Book 1995, 1997, 1998, 2000, 2001, 2004, 2008, 2012

Russia, State Duma
Russia, State Duma
State Duma, Deputy Chairmen